is a Japanese attorney and politician who represents Shizuoka Prefecture in the House of Representatives.

Legal career 
Aoyama was born in Shizuoka City and graduated from the faculty of law at Tohoku University. He practiced as an attorney before entering politics, and served as deputy chair of the Shizuoka Bar Association, among other posts. He was particularly active in representing plaintiffs in claims against the government related to hepatitis B infections and the Hamaoka Nuclear Power Plant.

Political career 
Aoyama ran in the 2017 general election as a Constitutional Democratic Party candidate in the Shizuoka 1st district, and won a seat in the House of Representatives through the proportional representation ticket.

Days after the election, the weekly magazine Shukan Bunshun published allegations by a secretary at Aoyama's law firm that he had made inappropriate sexual advances against her, including groping her leg in the back seat of a taxi. Aoyama issued an apology while denying some of the harassment claims. He was indefinitely suspended from CDP membership on October 26.

References

External links 
 Official website (Japanese)

Japanese politicians
20th-century Japanese lawyers
1962 births
People from Shizuoka (city)
Tohoku University alumni
Living people
21st-century Japanese lawyers